, also known in Japan as The Ghost Holly, is a Japanese anime television series directed by Minoru Okazaki. The series first aired in Japan on the NHK network between January 28, 1991, and April 6, 1993, spanning 200 episodes.

Story
Holly the Ghost is about Holly (Chocola) who wants to be a "holly ghost".  "Holly ghost" is a group of "monsters" who spread fear. Their leader is a witch called Majoline. Together with his 4 new friends (Candy, Toreppaa, etc.) he learns to be a real "holly ghost".

Main characters
Holly

Piiton

Majoline

Toreppaa

Kakarasu

Candy

External links
 
 

1991 anime television series debuts
Children's manga
Comedy anime and manga
Fictional ghosts
NHK original programming